George Rose may refer to:

 George Rose (politician) (1744–1818), British Member of Parliament, Clerk of the Parliaments and Treasurer of the Navy, 1807–1818
 George Henry Rose (1771–1855), his son, British Member of Parliament and Clerk of the Parliaments, 1818–1855
George M. Rose, state legislator in North Carolina
 George Pitt Rose (1797-1851), his son, British Member of Parliament and Army Officer
 George Rose (barrister) (1782–1873), barrister and law reporter
 George Rose, co-founder of the Boston, Massachusetts streetcar company Gore, Rose and Company
 George Rose (writer), (1817-1882), novelist and entertainer (pseudonym Arthur Sketchley)
 George Rose (Australian photographer) (1861–1942), Australian photographer and father of Herbert Rose (artist)
 George Rose (Navy member) (1880–1932), United States Navy officer
 George Rose (actor) (1920–1988), British actor
 George Rose (American football) (1942-2023), former National Football League cornerback
 George Rose (photographer), (born 1952), U.S. photographer
 George Rose (businessman), British businessman
 George Rose (rugby league) (born 1983), Australian rugby league footballer
——
 Giwargis Warda, Syriac poet from the 13th century